Kauria is a rare genus of moth in the family Geometridae, found most commonly in the Appalachian Mountains.

References
Natural History Museum Lepidoptera genus database

Melanthiini